This is a list of monuments in the former Rukum District, Nepal as officially recognized by and available through the website of the Department of Archaeology, Nepal.

Rukum was a district in midwestern Nepal. It was divided in 2015 into Eastern Rukum District (in Lumbini Province) and Western Rukum District (in Karnali Province).

List of monuments

|}

See also 
 List of monuments in Karnali Province
 List of monuments in Lumbini Province
 List of monuments in Nepal

References 

Rukum
Rukum District